Homam may refer to:
 Homam (star), the traditional name of the star Zeta Pegasi
 Heroes of Might and Magic, a series of computer games
 Homam (film), a 2008 Telugu film
 Homam, Iran, a village in Isfahan Province, Iran
 Homam-e Tabrizi, Persian poet

See also
 Homa (ritual), a Hindu ceremonial ritual